Lauriana Mae (born January 18, 1983) is an American pop, R&B and soul singer-songwriter. She has collaborated with musicians such as CeeLo Green, Kwamé and B.o.B. In 2013, she performed guest vocals on "Only You" with Green which also led to a performance on The Ellen DeGeneres Show on April 17, 2013.

Mae’s upcoming project will release on her Team Pains Music Group label in partnership with Empire and is called “Small Town City Dreams”. The project retraces some of Mae’s experiences.

Early life
Mae was born in Red Bank, New Jersey. She was influenced by Etta James, Billie Holiday and Ella Fitzgerald. Mae began singing at home inspired by her mother, who spotted her talent at an early age. Mae joined a church choir; that gave her the confidence to audition for a performing arts high school, where she was accepted. She majored in vocal music. Mae began performing at local talent shows, auditioning for various gigs and working with different groups. She was later part of the show Popstars group Scene 23.

2010s
Growing up in the landscape of diverse people, blue-collar ideals, and joyous backyard gatherings with dynamic music playing. Just an hour away from that world, Lauriana chased her calling in New York City. Since her adolescence, the singer with the smoky voice took to the Big Apple and eventually signed to Atlantic Records in 2011. Mae released her debut EP, Love Mae, shortly after.

In 2015, Mae had an extended play album called City of Diamonds. This album had hip hop and R&B music on it. In 2016, Mae collaborated with singer-songwriter and rapper Dreezy for Mae's R&B song "LOL". In late 2016 or early 2017, Mae released a full album called Can't Go Back featuring Dreezy and Wu-Tang Clan rapper Raekwon.

Discography

Albums 

Small Town City Dreams (2019)

Mixtapes 

Can't Go Back (2017)

EP’s

Love Mae (EP) (2011)
City of Diamonds (EP) (2015)
Can't Go Back (EP) (Lauriana Mae & Jack Splash) (2017)

Singles

Like A Drum (Beat It) (2011)
Money Mae (2011)
NYPD Blues (2015)
Protect Your Neck (2015)
LOL (feat. Dreezy) (2017)
Love To The CIty (2019)

References

External links
 

1983 births
Living people
Singers from New Jersey
American women pop singers
People from Red Bank, New Jersey
21st-century American women singers
21st-century American singers